This is a list of Canadian television related events from 1994.

Events

Debuts

Ending this year

Television shows

1950s
Country Canada (1954–2007)
Hockey Night in Canada (1952–present)
The National (1954–present).
Front Page Challenge (1957–1995)

1960s
CTV National News (1961–present)
Land and Sea (1964–present)
Man Alive (1967–2000)
Mr. Dressup (1967–1996)
The Nature of Things (1960–present, scientific documentary series)
Question Period (1967–present, news program)
W-FIVE (1966–present, newsmagazine program)

1970s
Canada AM (1972–present, news program)
the fifth estate (1975–present, newsmagazine program)
Marketplace (1972–present, newsmagazine program)
100 Huntley Street (1977–present, religious program)

1980s
Adrienne Clarkson Presents (1988–1999)
CityLine (1987–present, news program)
Fashion File (1989–2009)
Fred Penner's Place (1985–1997)
Just For Laughs (1988–present)
Midday (1985–2000)
On the Road Again (1987–2007)
Road to Avonlea (1989–1996)
Venture (1985–2007)

1990s
 Are You Afraid of the Dark? (1990–1996)
 Comics! (1993–1999)
 Madison (1993–1997)
 Neon Rider (1990–1995)
 North of 60 (1992–1997)
 The Passionate Eye (1993–present)
 Ready or Not (1993–1997)
 Royal Canadian Air Farce (1993–2008)
 The Red Green Show (1991–2006)
 This Hour Has 22 Minutes (1993–present)
 Witness (1992–2004)

TV movies
For the Love of Aaron

Television stations

Debuts

See also
 1994 in Canada
 List of Canadian films of 1994